John McRae is a Scottish international lawn bowler.

Bowls career
He won a bronze medal in the men's fours at the 1974 Commonwealth Games in Christchurch.

He played for the Uddingston Bowls Club and captained Scotland for eight years.

References

Living people
Scottish male bowls players
Commonwealth Games bronze medallists for Scotland
Bowls players at the 1974 British Commonwealth Games
Commonwealth Games medallists in lawn bowls
Year of birth missing (living people)
Medallists at the 1974 British Commonwealth Games